The Royal Arch Masonic Lodge in Austin, Texas is a three-story beige brick Masonic building that was built in Beaux Arts style in 1926.  It was designed by Texas architects J. B. Davies and William E. Ketchum.  It was listed as a historic landmark by the city of Austin in 2000, and it was listed on the National Register of Historic Places in 2005.

It was still in use as a meeting place in 2005 and was deemed significant "for its long and continued use as a Masonic Lodge in Austin" and "for its architecture as a good representation of an early twentieth-century Beaux-Arts fraternal building."

References

City of Austin Historic Landmarks
Buildings and structures in Austin, Texas
National Register of Historic Places in Austin, Texas
Beaux-Arts architecture in Texas
Masonic buildings completed in 1926
Masonic buildings in Texas
Clubhouses on the National Register of Historic Places in Texas